The Acme Corporation is a fictional corporation that features prominently in the Road Runner/Wile E. Coyote animated shorts  as a running gag. The company manufactures outlandish products that fail or backfire catastrophically at the worst possible times. The name is also used as a generic title in many cartoons, especially those made by Warner Bros. and films, TV series, commercials and comic strips. 

The company name in the Road Runner cartoons is ironic, since the word acme is derived from Greek (ακμή, English transliteration: akmē) meaning the peak, zenith or prime, yet products from the fictional Acme Corporation are often generic, failure-prone or explosive.

Origin
The name Acme comes from the Greek (ἀκμή, English transliteration: akmē), meaning summit, highest point, extremity or peak. It has been falsely claimed to be an acronym, either for "A Company Making Everything", "American Companies Make Everything", or "American Company that Manufactures Everything." During the 1920s, the word was commonly used in the names of businesses in order to be listed toward the beginning of alphabetized telephone directories like the Yellow Pages, and implied being the best. It is used in an ironic sense in cartoons, because the products are often failure-prone or explosive.

The name Acme began being depicted in film starting in the silent era, such as the 1920 Neighbors with Buster Keaton and the 1922 Grandma's Boy with Harold Lloyd, continuing with TV series, such as in early episodes of I Love Lucy and The Andy Griffith Show, comic strips and cartoons, especially those made by Warner Bros., and commercials. It briefly appeared in the Walt Disney Donald Duck episodes Cured Duck released in 1945 and Three for Breakfast released in 1948. It also appears as the ACME Mining company owned by the villain Rod Lacy in the 1952 Western The Duel at Silver Creek and in a 1938 short Violent Is the Word for Curly where The Three Stooges appear as gas station attendants at an Acme Service Station. It was also used in the Pink Panther Show, where the name Acme was used on several episodes of the show's first installment in 1969, one of them being "Pink Pest Control". 

Warner Brothers animator Chuck Jones described the reason 'Acme' was used in cartoons at the time:

Whistles and traffic lights

A whistle named 'Acme City', made from mid-1870s onwards by J Hudson & Co, followed by the "Acme Thunderer", and "Acme siren" in 1895, were the early brand names bearing the names with the word 'Acme'. At the time the Acme Traffic Signal Company produced the traffic lights in Los Angeles, the city where Warner Bros. was making its cartoons. Instead of today's amber/yellow traffic light, bells rang as the small red and green lights with "Stop" and "Go" semaphore arms changed — a process that took five seconds.

Fictional depiction
The company is never clearly defined in Road Runner cartoons but appears to be a conglomerate which produces every product type imaginable, no matter how elaborate or extravagant—most of which never work as desired or expected (some products do work very well, but backfire against the coyote). In the Road Runner cartoon Beep, Beep, it was referred to as "Acme Rocket-Powered Products, Inc." based in Fairfield, New Jersey. Many of its products appear to be produced specifically for Wile E. Coyote; for example, the Acme Giant Rubber Band, subtitled "(For Tripping Road Runners)".

While their products leave much to be desired, Acme delivery service is second to none; Wile E. can merely drop an order into a mailbox (or enter an order on a website, as in the Looney Tunes: Back in Action movie), and have the product in his hands within seconds.

In film and TV

Examples which specifically reference the Wile E. Coyote cartoon character include:

 Films, shows and cartoons based on Looney Tunes characters often deal with Acme Corporation.
 The 1988 film Who Framed Roger Rabbit attempted to explain Acme's inner workings in detail. The movie's plot is centered on the murder of the corporation's founder, Marvin Acme (Stubby Kaye). Many of the film's scenes involve Acme products and the film's climax is set in an Acme warehouse.
 The Tiny Toon Adventures series expanded on Acme's influence, with the entire setting of the show taking place in a city called "Acme Acres". The show's young protagonists attended "Acme Looniversity". In one episode, the coyote sues Acme, accusing it of making products that are unsafe. 
 The corporation appears as the antagonistic force of Looney Tunes: Back in Action. The head offices of Acme are depicted, revealing it to be a multinational corporation whose executive officers are led by the film's main antagonist, Mr. Chairman, portrayed by Steve Martin.
 The 2015 direct-to-video animated film Looney Tunes: Rabbits Run portrays Acme as a department store.
 In August 2018, Warner Bros. announced they were developing a Coyote vs. Acme animated movie with Chris McKay producing and Jon and Josh Silberman completing the script. However, by December 2019, the project was reportedly looking for a writer. A year later, James Gunn was announced as both producer and writer on the project and a release date in 2023.
 The cartoon series Loonatics Unleashed is set in Acmetropolis.
 The corporation is mentioned in Animaniacs, such as the Acme song from Cookies for Einstein, and Pinky and the Brains home in Acme Labs. In Wakko's Wish, the Animaniacs feature film, characters live in the village of Acme Falls.
 External World, a short film by David OReilly, features Acme Retirement Castle, a dystopian retirement facility for disabled cartoon characters.
 In the 1978 animated special Raggedy Ann and Andy in The Great Santa Claus Caper (written, directed, and co-produced by Chuck Jones), Acme is credited as making Gloopstick, touted as a clear indestructible compound to perfectly preserve toys. Gloopstick is brought to Santa Claus' workshop by "inefficiency expert" Alexander Graham Wolf, who strongly resembles Wile E. Coyote in appearance & voice.

Music

 Bell X1's song "One Stringed Harp" includes the lyric "Like Wile E. Coyote/As if the fall wasn't enough/Those bastards from Acme/They got more nasty stuff".
 The Brazilian thrash metal band Chakal has a song titled "Acme Dead End Road" from its 1990 album, The Man Is His Own Jackal. The song begins with the Road Runner signature sound "beep, beep".

Legal humor
Joey Green wrote "Cliff-hanger Justice", a fictional account of a product liability lawsuit by Wile E. Coyote against Acme, which appeared in three parts in the August, September, and October 1982 issues of National Lampoon magazine.
Ian Frazier wrote a fictional legal complaint "Coyote v. Acme", which was published in The New Yorker and later became the title piece of a short fiction collection. It also serves as inspiration for the upcoming film Coyote vs. Acme due to be released in 2023.
Acme Corp. frequently appears in LSAT questions.

Other

 The Comprehensive Perl Archive Network provides an "Acme::" namespace which contains many humorous, useless and abstract modules for the Perl programming language. It was named "in homage to that greatest of all absurd system creators: Wile E. Coyote."
 Acme Communications was a former U.S. broadcasting company established by former Fox Broadcasting Company executive Jamie Kellner. The stations were affiliated with Warner Bros's broadcast television network The WB, for which he was also a founding executive, and the Acme name was a reference to the cartoon.
 ACME Night is a Cartoon Network block.

See also
 Ajax name brand of the Mickey Mouse universe
 List of filmmakers' signatures
 Placeholder name

References

External links

  From  - Mock legal opening statement.
 

Fictional brands
Fictional companies
In-jokes
Looney Tunes
Running gags
Who Framed Roger Rabbit